Héctor Campos may refer to:

 Héctor Campos (judoka)
 Héctor Campos (sailor)
 Héctor Campos Parsi, Puerto Rican composer